Albert Valdemar (Atte) Willberg (30 December 1884 – 14 February 1935) was a Finnish architect.

References

1884 births
1935 deaths
20th-century Finnish architects
19th-century Finnish architects
Architects from Helsinki